JHB may refer to:

 Jaime Herrera Beutler, former member of the U.S. House of Representatives (as of January 3, 2023)
 Johannesburg, South Africa
 Senai International Airport, Johor, Malaysia